Mohammed Mustafa Amer (born July 24, 1981) is a Palestinian American stand-up comedian. He is best known for his Netflix comedy special Mo Amer: The Vagabond, and his role as one third of the comedy trio Allah Made Me Funny. He also starred for two seasons, alongside comedian Ramy Youssef, in the Hulu sitcom Ramy as Ramy's cousin Mo, who owns a diner. He stars in the film Black Adam. He also created and stars in a Netflix TV show called Mo. The show is loosely based on his own experience growing up as a Palestinian refugee and was released in August 2022. Amer will host the 2023 season of Doha Debates' flagship series, to be filmed before a live audience in Qatar's Education City.

Early life 
Amer is of Palestinian descent, and the youngest of six children. Amer's father worked as an engineer for the Kuwait Oil Company. He attended a British school in Kuwait where he learned English and spoke it in a British accent. When he was 9, he, his sister Haifa, his brother, and his mother fled 
Kuwait during the Gulf War. They immigrated to the United States and settled in Houston, Texas. He was placed in an ESL class where he was the only student who spoke English.

Two years later, in 1992, Amer's father, a telecom engineer, joined them in the United States. Amer attended school at Piney Point Elementary while his older brothers studied overseas. His brother Omar is a pilot; another brother has a PhD in biochemistry. In 1995, when Amer was 14 years old, his father died.

Career 
Amer's elder brother took him to see Bill Cosby perform at the Houston Astrodome when he was 10 years old. At age 14, Amer discovered stand-up comedy at a Texas rodeo.

After the death of his father, Amer started being truant and taking unsanctioned trips to Mexico with his friends. An English teacher made a deal with Amer that if he performed a monologue from William Shakespeare in front of her class, she would reinstate his grade before his truancy began and allow him to try comedy in front of the class every Friday. Amer graduated and focused on his passion. He then participated in and had leading roles in high school theatre, and started performing stand-up comedy by impersonating family members and developed it over a few years in the comedy club scene. Amer performed at Houston's comedy clubs as often as possible to refine his act while working a day job at a flag manufacturing company owned by a family friend.

In June 1999, Amer entered Houston's Funniest Person Contest and made the finals. There another comedian directed him to The Comedy Showcase as the best guided comedy room. The owner of The Comedy Showcase, Danny Martinez, mentored and taught him about stand-up. At age 19, he was being flown out to play to US troops stationed abroad. becoming the first and only Arab-American refugee comic to perform for US and coalition troops overseas.

Amer has performed tours in over 27 countries on five continents, including Germany, Italy, Sicily, Japan, South Korea, and Bahrain, as well as with other Muslim comedians Preacher Moss and Azhar Usman in the Allah Made Me Funny comedy tour since 2006.

In 2004, he performed at The Comedy Festival in Las Vegas.

In April 2007, he performed at the Islamic Relief Evening of Inspiration event at the Royal Albert Hall organised by Islamic Relief.

In July 2008, he performed at the Islam Expo in Olympia, London. In October 2008, he performed at the Global Peace and Unity event in the ExCeL Exhibition Centre in London organised by Islam Channel.

As well as with Allah Made Me Funny, Amer has performed at sold-out shows worldwide, including Royal Albert Hall and Hammersmith Apollo (London), Acer Arena (Sydney), Nelson Mandela Theatre (Johannesburg), Shrine Auditorium (Los Angeles), as well as the Malmö Arts Festival (Sweden), the Amman Stand-up Comedy Festival (Jordan), and the World's Funniest Island Festival (Australia).

Amer has been interviewed on television and radio, including on NPR, BBC, and CNN. He has appeared on television, starred in an independent films, and has been interviewed by over 100 major world media outlets, including The New York Times, Rolling Stone, and The Guardian. He was also featured on Al-Bernameg with Bassem Youssef (The Daily Show of Egypt) as the only Arab-American comedian to appear on the show.

In June 2013, Amer featured on an interfaith special, What's So Funny About Religion?, which was broadcast on the CBS Television Network.

Amer developed his first solo feature-length documentary-comedy special, working with long-time standup collaborator Azhar Usman, co-produced through their jointly owned production entity, Kalijaga Media LLC. On May 3, 2015, Amer recorded his one-hour special, Legally Homeless, at the Warner Theatre presented by Live Nation Comedy. He became the first Arab-American to star in his own nationally televised one-hour stand-up special. The show's title is derived from the fact that Amer has traveled to more than 20 countries without a passport, and straddled multiple cultures while growing up in the U.S. Legally Homeless includes appearances by Azhar Usman, Bassem Youssef, Hasan Minhaj, Ramy Youssef, and independent rapper Brother Ali.

From August 10–13, 2015, Amer joined Bob Alper and Ahmed Ahmed for four nights of comedy in Ramallah, West Bank.

Amer also has co-written an original feature screenplay with award-winning filmmaker Iman Zawahry and longtime stand-up collaborator Azhar Usman.

In October 2015, Amer began touring with and opening for Dave Chappelle regularly across the U.S.

In March 2017, Amer made his U.S. network television debut on The Late Show with Stephen Colbert.

In 2018, Amer joined the cast of the Hulu show Ramy, starring Ramy Youssef, where he plays Ramy's cousin Mo, who owns and operates a diner, where many of the show's characters congregate. Amer is currently in the second season of Ramy.

Amer filmed his first Netflix comedy special on June 27, 2018, at Paramount Theatre in Austin, Texas. It was released as Mo Amer: The Vagabond on Netflix in 2018.

He also created and stars in a new TV series on Netflix called Mo, released in August 2022. The series (co created by Ramy Youssef), is loosely based on Amer's experience growing up as a Palestinian refugee.

Comedy style 
Amer's work promotes art and understanding between the diverse cultures of the world, and his ethnic and family background situates him to speak about the problems of religion, terror, and current politics of—through the lens of personal stories about his family and himself. He talks about his Palestinian background, family histories and growing up American.

Personal life 
Amer lived in Los Angeles with his Mexican-American wife and step-daughter. In his 2021 Netflix special, Mo Amer: Mohammed in Texas, he states he got divorced during the COVID-19 pandemic.

In 2009, Amer became a U.S. citizen which enabled him to travel to Palestine and Jordan and visit family he had not seen for almost 20 years. He also returned to Kuwait and Baghdad for the first time since his family fled.

Filmography

Film

Television

Awards and nominations

See also 
Palestinian Americans
Palestinian diaspora
List of American Muslims

References

External links 

21st-century American comedians
American comedians of Arab descent
American Muslims
Palestinian Muslims
Palestinian emigrants to the United States
Palestinian expatriates in the United States
American stand-up comedians
Muslim male comedians
Writers from Los Angeles
Writers from Houston
Allah Made Me Funny
1981 births
Living people